The Jiji Weir is a weir located in Nantou County, Taiwan. The weir is located at the border of three townships in the county, which are Jiji Township, Lugu Township and Zhushan Township.

History
The construction of the weir started in July 1990 and completed in December 2001.

Architecture
The weir features the Taiwan Water Museum within Jiji Township border.

Transportation
The weir is accessible southwest of Jiji station of Taiwan Railways.

See also
 List of dams and reservoirs in Taiwan

References

2001 establishments in Taiwan
Buildings and structures in Nantou County
Dams completed in 2001
Weirs